"Ryanair Song" is a song by Scottish singer-songwriter Malcolm Middleton. It is his first single, released as a 7" single on 23 February 2004, limited to 1000 copies on Nowhere Fast.

Track listing
Songs, lyrics and music by Malcolm Middleton.
7" SMALL02
"Ryanair Song" – 2:32
"7" Cigarette" – 4:24

Notes

External links
"Ryanair Song" Lyrics

Ryanair Song
Malcolm Middleton songs
Songs written by Malcolm Middleton
2004 songs